Martin Uherek (September 22, 1987), is a jazz saxophonist from Slovakia.

Childhood

Though not growing up in family of solely musical profession, Martin Uherek came in touch with music since the earliest age, through a church choir led by his father. He soon showed a lot of interest in music, having a good time figuring out and self-teaching different instruments, such as piano, guitar, flute, or drums. Several years after entering grade school, he started his formal studies on flute, and soon switched to clarinet, which he studied until he finished high school. A change in his musical life came in 2004/2005, his 3rd year of high school, when he participated in a 1-year exchange study program at St. Mary Central High School (Neenah, Wisconsin). Here, after hearing a recording of Charlie Parker called Confirmation, Martin fell in love with jazz music more than ever before and decided to pursue music career, with focus on jazz. He went on to study saxophone at Conservatory of J.L.Bella under leadership of Radoslav Solárik, which he finished in 2011. Besides the conservatory he also attended private music school, where he studied jazz music for 6 years under leadership of great jazz pianist Klaudius Kováč.

Musical career

In 2008 he founded his band Martin Uherek Quartet, with strong roots in jazz tradition, which still functions today and is focused on interpretation of jazz of the 1930s to 1950s. In October 2008 Martin competed with his band in the 1st Tarnow International Jazz Contest in Poland, where their band won 2nd prize in the younger category and in addition, Martin was awarded as soloist in this category. In December 2008, their band became the laureate of Slovak national jazz competition “New Faces of Slovak Jazz 2008”. During 2009–2010, he was also a member of a stable jazz group, Ľuboš Brtáň Quartet. In the past few years he has also played with some of the top Slovak jazz players, both in Slovakia and abroad, such as Klaudius Kováč, Róbert Ragan, Peter Solárik, Jozef "Ischias" Döme, Juraj Bartoš, Jeff Gardner...
In the present, Martin works with many of his colleagues from Banska Bystrica, usually under Martin Uherek Quartet, focusing on swing and bebop.
During his career, Martin played several concert tours throughout Slovakia, and also performed on jazz festivals abroad (Poland, Hungary). Recently Martin with his band won a contest of young talents on Bratislava Jazz Days 2012 and in October 2013, he and his band opened on the main stage of Bratislava Jazz Days 2013 with his newest program Martin Uherek Quartet - Remembering Monk, dedicated as a tribute to the great pianist and composer Thelonious Monk.

Walkin' My Own Way (debut album)

In November 2015, Martin released his debut album titled Walkin’ My Own Way. It presents his personal statement – about the path that he is on, things that he has experienced as a musician and also about the direction that he decided to pursue, with thanks to everyone that influenced him on this musical journey. Each composition on the album is dedicated to a certain part of Uherek's life, usually to the musicians that were important to him during those times. The core band on this album is the pianoless trio: Martin Uherek – saxophone, Peter Korman – double bass, Pavol Blaho – drums. There are also special guest appearances, top Slovak jazz players who influenced Uherek on his musical journey – pianist Klaudius Kováč, trumpeter Juraj Bartos and alto saxophonist Radovan Tariska. The album was recorded in August 2015 in Banská Bystrica and was released under label Music Fund Slovakia in November 2015.

Influences

As his biggest influence Martin considers Charlie Parker, coining him with phrase “the reason why I even play the sax”. In addition, playing tenor (besides alto sax), he deeply admires the beautiful and sensitive playing of the tenor sax great Ben Webster as well as the father of the tenor saxophone, Coleman Hawkins.
Among other favorite musicians he also counts Sonny Rollins, and majority of the key figures of swing and bebop era, like Duke Ellington, Bud Powell, Billie Holiday and others.

Instruments set-up
Uherek uses tenor saxophone C.G. Conn New Wonder I, with Otto Link Florida No USA mouthpiece and Rico Royal reeds.
With regards to alto playing, he uses Schagerl alto saxophone model Amadeus 66, with Brilhart Tonalin mouthpiece and Alexander NY reeds.

References

External links
 Official website of Martin Uherek
 Martin Uherek at jazz.sk

1987 births
Living people
Slovak jazz musicians